The 1940 All-Southern Conference football team consists of American football players chosen by the Associated Press (AP) and United Press (UP) for the All-Southern Conference football team for the 1940 college football season.

All-Southern Conference selections

Backs
 Laianne, North Carolina (AP-1)
 Steve Lach, Duke (AP-1) (College Football Hall of Fame)
 Tony Gallovich, Wake Forest (AP-1)
 Charlie Timmons, Clemson (AP-1)

Ends
 Joe Blalock, Clemson (AP-1)
 Paul Severin, North Carolina (AP-1)

Tackles
 Andy Fronczek, Richmond (AP-1)
 Tony Ruffa, Duke (AP-1)

Guards
 Alex Winterson, Duke (AP-1)
 Faircloth, North Carolina (AP-1)

Centers
 Bob Barnett, Duke (AP-1)

Key
AP = Associated Press

UP = United Press

See also
1940 College Football All-America Team

References

All-Southern Conference football team
All-Southern Conference football teams